Ophiobolus is a genus of fungi in the family Phaeosphaeriaceae.

Species

Ophiobolus acerinus
Ophiobolus aconiti
Ophiobolus actinidiae
Ophiobolus acuminatus
Ophiobolus adnatus
Ophiobolus affinis
Ophiobolus alismatis
Ophiobolus andropognis
Ophiobolus angelensis
Ophiobolus anguillides
Ophiobolus annonae
Ophiobolus anonae
Ophiobolus antarcticus
Ophiobolus antenoreus
Ophiobolus anthemidis
Ophiobolus anthrisci
Ophiobolus arenarius
Ophiobolus artemisiae
Ophiobolus artemisiicola
Ophiobolus asclepiadis
Ophiobolus aspiciliae
Ophiobolus asteris
Ophiobolus atropae
Ophiobolus australiensis
Ophiobolus babajaniae
Ophiobolus babajanii
Ophiobolus bacillatus
Ophiobolus bactrosporus
Ophiobolus barbanae
Ophiobolus barbarus
Ophiobolus barbatus
Ophiobolus bardanae
Ophiobolus bonplandii
Ophiobolus brachyascus
Ophiobolus brachysporus
Ophiobolus brachystoma
Ophiobolus brachystomus
Ophiobolus broussonetiae
Ophiobolus buddleiae
Ophiobolus buddlejae
Ophiobolus butleri
Ophiobolus byssicola
Ophiobolus caballeroi
Ophiobolus cajani
Ophiobolus calaminthae
Ophiobolus calathicola
Ophiobolus calathus
Ophiobolus camptosporus
Ophiobolus cannabinus
Ophiobolus cantareirensis
Ophiobolus capitatus
Ophiobolus cardomae
Ophiobolus cariceti
Ophiobolus carneus
Ophiobolus carpathicus
Ophiobolus castillejae
Ophiobolus catharanthicola
Ophiobolus cesatianus
Ophiobolus chaetophorus
Ophiobolus characiae
Ophiobolus characias
Ophiobolus chilensis
Ophiobolus chrysanthemi
Ophiobolus cirsii
Ophiobolus cirsii-altissimi
Ophiobolus claviger
Ophiobolus clavisporus
Ophiobolus clematidis
Ophiobolus coffeae
Ophiobolus coffeatus
Ophiobolus coicis
Ophiobolus collapsus
Ophiobolus comatus
Ophiobolus compar
Ophiobolus compressus
Ophiobolus consimilis
Ophiobolus constrictus
Ophiobolus crassus
Ophiobolus culmorum
Ophiobolus cytisi-laburni
Ophiobolus dictamni
Ophiobolus didolotii
Ophiobolus dipsaci
Ophiobolus disseminans
Ophiobolus dothidearum
Ophiobolus dracocephali-altaijensis
Ophiobolus dracocephali-altajensis
Ophiobolus drechsleri
Ophiobolus eburensis
Ophiobolus echii
Ophiobolus echinopis
Ophiobolus edax
Ophiobolus elaeosporus
Ophiobolus elegans
Ophiobolus ellisianus
Ophiobolus epilobii
Ophiobolus eryngii
Ophiobolus erythrosporus
Ophiobolus eucalypti
Ophiobolus eucalyptus
Ophiobolus eucryptus
Ophiobolus euphorbiae
Ophiobolus eusporus
Ophiobolus exilis
Ophiobolus feltgeni
Ophiobolus feltgenii
Ophiobolus festucae
Ophiobolus filiformis
Ophiobolus filisporus
Ophiobolus florentinus
Ophiobolus fragilisporus
Ophiobolus fragmentarius
Ophiobolus fruticum
Ophiobolus fulgidus
Ophiobolus galii
Ophiobolus galii-veri
Ophiobolus gangetici
Ophiobolus gangeticum
Ophiobolus georginae
Ophiobolus glomus
Ophiobolus gnaphalii
Ophiobolus gonatosporus
Ophiobolus gracilis
Ophiobolus graffianus
Ophiobolus graminicolus
Ophiobolus graminis
Ophiobolus granati
Ophiobolus halimodendri
Ophiobolus halimus
Ophiobolus hamasporus
Ophiobolus hazslinszkyi
Ophiobolus helianthi
Ophiobolus helianthi
Ophiobolus helicosporus
Ophiobolus herbarum
Ophiobolus herpotrichus
Ophiobolus hesperidis
Ophiobolus hesperidis
Ophiobolus heterostrophus
Ophiobolus heveae
Ophiobolus hormosporus
Ophiobolus huebneri
Ophiobolus humuli
Ophiobolus hyperici
Ophiobolus hypophyllus
Ophiobolus hübneri
Ophiobolus idamalayarensis
Ophiobolus immersus
Ophiobolus implexus
Ophiobolus incomptus
Ophiobolus incomptus
Ophiobolus indigoferae
Ophiobolus inflatus
Ophiobolus ingae
Ophiobolus instabilis
Ophiobolus intermedius
Ophiobolus ipohensis
Ophiobolus isiacus
Ophiobolus italicus
Ophiobolus jacobaeae
Ophiobolus javanicus
Ophiobolus junci
Ophiobolus juncicola
Ophiobolus junicola
Ophiobolus kavinae
Ophiobolus kniepii
Ophiobolus koerberi
Ophiobolus kugitangi
Ophiobolus kusanoi
Ophiobolus laminariae
Ophiobolus landoltii
Ophiobolus lantanae
Ophiobolus lapponicus
Ophiobolus lathyri
Ophiobolus lepidolophae
Ophiobolus leptospermus
Ophiobolus leptosphaerioides
Ophiobolus leptosphaerioides
Ophiobolus leptosporus
Ophiobolus licualae
Ophiobolus linosporoides
Ophiobolus lithophilus
Ophiobolus littoralis
Ophiobolus littoralis
Ophiobolus livistonae
Ophiobolus lohwagianus
Ophiobolus longisporus
Ophiobolus lonicerae
Ophiobolus malleolus
Ophiobolus manihotis
Ophiobolus maquilingianus
Ophiobolus maritimus
Ophiobolus mathieui
Ophiobolus mayorii
Ophiobolus medusa
Ophiobolus medusae
Ophiobolus megalosporus
Ophiobolus melghatibus
Ophiobolus melghaticus
Ophiobolus melioloides
Ophiobolus microstomus
Ophiobolus minor
Ophiobolus miscanthi
Ophiobolus miyabeanus
Ophiobolus montagneanus
Ophiobolus montellicus
Ophiobolus moravicus
Ophiobolus morthieri
Ophiobolus munkii
Ophiobolus murashkinskyi
Ophiobolus myrti
Ophiobolus niesslii
Ophiobolus nigrifacta
Ophiobolus nigrificans
Ophiobolus nigroclypeatus
Ophiobolus nigromaculatus
Ophiobolus nipae
Ophiobolus oedema
Ophiobolus oedistoma
Ophiobolus olivaceus
Ophiobolus ophioboloides
Ophiobolus origani
Ophiobolus oryzae
Ophiobolus oryzinus
Ophiobolus oxysporus
Ophiobolus paludosus
Ophiobolus paluster
Ophiobolus palustris
Ophiobolus pangkarensis
Ophiobolus panici
Ophiobolus paraensis
Ophiobolus paraënsis
Ophiobolus parmensis
Ophiobolus passiflorae
Ophiobolus pastinaceus
Ophiobolus peduncularis
Ophiobolus pellitus
Ophiobolus peltigerae
Ophiobolus peltigerarum
Ophiobolus penicillus
Ophiobolus periclymeni
Ophiobolus persolinus
Ophiobolus petiolaris
Ophiobolus phlomidis
Ophiobolus phragmosporus
Ophiobolus polygoni
Ophiobolus polytrichi
Ophiobolus ponticus
Ophiobolus porphyrogonus
Ophiobolus prunellae
Ophiobolus prunicola
Ophiobolus pseudacori
Ophiobolus pseudaffinis
Ophiobolus ptarmicae
Ophiobolus purpureus
Ophiobolus rechingeri
Ophiobolus resedae
Ophiobolus rhagadioli
Ophiobolus rhamni
Ophiobolus rivulariosporus
Ophiobolus robustus
Ophiobolus rossicus
Ophiobolus rostrupii
Ophiobolus rubellus
Ophiobolus rudis
Ophiobolus sajanycus
Ophiobolus salicinus
Ophiobolus salinus
Ophiobolus salsolae
Ophiobolus sambuci
Ophiobolus sarmenti
Ophiobolus sarmentorum
Ophiobolus sarothamni
Ophiobolus sativus
Ophiobolus saturejae
Ophiobolus sceliscophorus
Ophiobolus schwarzmanianus
Ophiobolus scolymi
Ophiobolus scrophulariae
Ophiobolus scrophulariae
Ophiobolus senecionis
Ophiobolus seriatus
Ophiobolus setariae
Ophiobolus shoemakeri
Ophiobolus smyrnii
Ophiobolus solidaginis
Ophiobolus spina
Ophiobolus spirosporus
Ophiobolus staphylinus
Ophiobolus steinii
Ophiobolus stenosporus
Ophiobolus stictisporus
Ophiobolus stipae
Ophiobolus stromaticus
Ophiobolus styracincola
Ophiobolus subgen. Ophiobolus
Ophiobolus subgen. Ophiochaeta
Ophiobolus subgen. Plejobolus
Ophiobolus subolivaceus
Ophiobolus surculorum
Ophiobolus tanaceti
Ophiobolus tenellus
Ophiobolus tenuis
Ophiobolus terebinthi
Ophiobolus thallicola
Ophiobolus theissenii
Ophiobolus therryanus
Ophiobolus tortilis
Ophiobolus trechisporus
Ophiobolus trichellus
Ophiobolus trichisporus
Ophiobolus trichosporus
Ophiobolus troakei
Ophiobolus typhae
Ophiobolus ulnosporus
Ophiobolus urticae
Ophiobolus verminosus
Ophiobolus vermisporus
Ophiobolus versisporus
Ophiobolus virgultorum
Ophiobolus vitalbae
Ophiobolus volkartii
Ophiobolus vulgaris
Ophiobolus xanthii
Ophiobolus zeae

References

Pleosporales